The ram-air inflatable single-line kite is one of the few modern inventions in the world of kite design. Although Francis Rogallo's early kite patents had ram-air members in the claims, Domina Jalbert's parafoil ram-air wing, patented in 1944, emphatically changed the kite airscape for inflatable kites. 

Kytoons and balloon kites are inflatable kites. Kites sometimes combine ram-air inflation as well as closed-bladder inflation.  The shape is loosely derived from an airfoil with air inlets usually at the front, and a bridle which distributes the tether line loads evenly across the whole base of the kite. These kites have no rigid spars. 

The immense strength of synthetic fabrics allows the creation of non-rigid three-dimensional shapes which hold their shape because the pressure of the air inside the kite is slightly higher than the pressure outside.  

As with hot air balloons, artistic creativity is often applied, so that fish, cats, and many other animals and characters are depicted. Sizes range from 2 m in length to 65 m. The world's largest kites are inflatable single-line kites designed and made by New Zealand kitemaker Peter Lynn.

Types of inflatable single-line kites 
 Ram-air-only soft fully flexible kite
 Ram-air-only inflation with spars also
 Gas inflatable kytoons. These are variously inflated with air, helium, hydrogen. When the kite wing is heavier-than-air, then the kytoon needs relative wind to fly. When the kite wing is lighter-than-air then the kytoon will stay aloft when the relative wind is below what is needed for kiting.
 Kites that combine both ram-air inflation and gas-bladders that are inflated.

See also
 List of inflatable manufactured goods
 Francis Rogallo
 Domina Jalbert

Kites
Inflatable manufactured goods